The 1986–87 South Pacific cyclone season was an event in the annual cycle of tropical cyclone formation. A total of 13 tropical cyclones developed during the season.


Seasonal summary 

During the season twelve tropical cyclones were recorded within the South Pacific basin, which was considered above average when compared to an 18-year average of 10 systems.

Systems

Tropical Cyclone Osea 

It moved on a southerly track parallel to Vanuatu and spent most of its time over the sea. No significant damage was reported.

Tropical Cyclone Patsy 

The system affected Northern Vanuatu but caused little or no damage to the island nation.

Severe Tropical Cyclone Raja 

Cyclone Raja existed from December 21, 1986, to January 5, 1987.

Severe Tropical Cyclone Sally 

Cyclone Sally existed from December 26, 1986, to January 6, 1987. It caused A$35 million of damage in the Cook Islands, making a thousand people homeless on Rarotonga and severely damaging 80% of the buildings in Avarua.

Severe Tropical Cyclone Tusi 

On January 13, TCWC Nadi started to monitor a tropical depression that had developed, within a trough of low pressure near the island nation of Tuvalu. Over the next few days the system gradually developed further before it was named Tusi during January 16, after it had become equivalent to a modern-day category 1 tropical cyclone on the Australian tropical cyclone intensity scale. After being named the system gradually intensified as it moved southeastwards along the trough, between the islands of Fakaofo and Swains during January 17. The system subsequently posed a threat to the Southern Cook Islands, however this threat gradually diminished as Tusi moved southwards and approached 25S on January 20.

Severe Tropical Cyclone Uma 

Cyclone Uma caused severe damages in Vanuatu. The storm formed on February 4th and dissipated on February 10th.

Tropical Cyclone Veli 

As the system continued to move eastwards it crossed 160°E and moved into the South Pacific basin during February 7, before the FMS named it Veli later that day on the basis of satellite derived evidence. During that day the system continued to move eastwards, before as it passed near to Espiritu Santo, Veli started to move steadily towards the south-east. During that day strong upper level north-westerlies caused vertical windshear to increase over Cyclones Veli and Uma and thus weakened them. During February 9, Cyclone Veli absorbed Uma and formed a complex low, which moved slowly south-eastwards and became extratropical. Damage within Vanuatu was either minimal or went unreported, as the island nation was more concerned with the aftermath of Cyclone Uma.

Severe Tropical Cyclone Wini 

Cyclone Wini existed from February 27 to March 7.

Tropical Cyclone Unnamed/19P

Severe Tropical Cyclone Yali 

Over the next 3 days the system remained as a shallow depression as it moved southwards, before it rapidly developed into a tropical cyclone underneath an upper-level ridge of high pressure. During March 8, the JTWC classified the system as Tropical Cyclone 22P and initiated advisories on the system, while it was named Yali by the FMS after it had developed into a Category 1 tropical cyclone on the Australian scale. This made it equivalent to a category 3 severe tropical cyclone on the Australian scale and a category 1 hurricane on the SSHWS. During the next day, Yali rapidly weakened and dissipated over water during March 11. Despite being within the vicinity of both Vanuatu and New Caledonia, the system did not pass close enough to affect or cause any damage to any inhabited islands.

Tropical Cyclone Zuman 

Cyclone Zuman existed from April 19 to April 26.

Tropical Cyclone Blanch

Other systems 
In addition to 12 named cyclones, two other systems developed during the season. Cyclone 13P existed from February 2 to February 5. Another system, 19P, existed from February 28 to March 3.

Seasonal effects 

|-
| Osea ||  || bgcolor=#|Category 2 tropical cyclone || bgcolor=#| || bgcolor=#| || None || None || None ||
|-
| Patsy ||  || bgcolor=#|Category 2 tropical cyclone || bgcolor=#| || bgcolor=#| || Vanuatu || || ||
|-
| Raja ||  || bgcolor=#|Category 3 severe tropical cyclone || bgcolor=#| || bgcolor=#| || Tuvalu, Wallis and Futuna, Fiji || $ || 2 ||
|-
| Sally ||  || bgcolor=#|Category 3 severe tropical cyclone || bgcolor=#| || bgcolor=#| || Cook Islands, French Polynesia || $ || ||
|-
| Tusi ||  || bgcolor=#|Category 3 severe tropical cyclone || bgcolor=#| || bgcolor=#| || Tokelau, Samoan Islands, Cook Islands || $ || None ||
|-
| 13P ||  || bgcolor=#| || bgcolor=#| || bgcolor=#| || || || ||
|-
| Uma ||  || bgcolor=#|Category 4 severe tropical cyclone || bgcolor=#| || bgcolor=#| || Vanuatu || $ || 50 ||
|-
| Veli ||  || bgcolor=#|Category 1 tropical cyclone || bgcolor=#| || bgcolor=#| || Vanuatu || Minimal || None ||
|-
| 19P ||  || bgcolor=#|Category 2 tropical cyclone || bgcolor=#| || bgcolor=#| || || || ||
|-
| Wini ||  || bgcolor=#|Category 3 severe tropical cyclone || bgcolor=#| || bgcolor=#| || Western Samoa, American Samoa || Extensive || None ||
|-
| Yali ||  || bgcolor=#|Category 3 severe tropical cyclone || bgcolor=#| || bgcolor=#| || Solomon Islands, Vanuatu, New Caledonia || None || None ||
|-
| Zuman ||  || bgcolor=#|Category 2 tropical cyclone || bgcolor=#| || bgcolor=#| || Western Samoa, American Samoa || || ||
|-
| Blanch(e) ||  || bgcolor=#| || bgcolor=#| || bgcolor=#| || Solomon Islands || || ||
|-

See also 

 List of off-season South Pacific tropical cyclones
 Atlantic hurricane seasons: 1987, 1988
 Eastern Pacific hurricane seasons: 1987, 1988
 Western Pacific typhoon seasons: 1987, 1988
 North Indian Ocean cyclone seasons: 1987, 1988

References

External links 

 
South Pacific cyclone seasons
Articles which contain graphical timelines
Tropical cyclones in 1986
Tropical cyclones in 1987